The Southeast Football League (SEFL) is an adult amateur American football league. The SEFL is headquartered in Miami, Florida, and began the 2013 season with twelve member teams from around the state of Florida.

The regular season is an eleven-week schedule during which each team has one bye week and plays ten games. Each team will play all other teams in their division once, and likewise for all other teams outside the division within the conference and/or league. The season starts in early February and runs weekly to late May.

The SEFL was founded in 1995 by Dr. Franklin F. Sands and Jesse L. Wiggins. The league operated through the 1997 season, then folded. It was resurrected by Wiggins in June 2002 and began playing again in the spring of 2003. The SEFL has been operational each year since.

The Miami Knights and the Central Florida Thoroughbreds have each participated in a record five SEFL Championship Title Games. The Knights have won more SEFL Championship titles than any other league franchise - five. The Thoroughbreds organization, winners of two SEFL Championship Titles, holds the league record for consecutive SEFL Championship Game appearances with five (2005–2009).

Member teams

The league had two divisions (North and South) as of January 1, 2014. Below is a list of the 2014 teams:

North Division

Broward Outlaws (Broward County)
Florida Kings (Homestead)
South Florida 49'ers (Lauderhill)
Miami Hustler Made (Miami)

Southeast Division
Miami Fins (Miami)
South Florida Dolphins (Miami)
Miami  Gators (Miramar)
Knights of Miami (Miami)
South Florida Patriots (Broward)
Bone Island Pirates (Key West)

Championship Game results 
2013 - South Florida 49'ers 25 Knights Of Miami  0
2012 - Knights of Miami 12, South Florida 49'ers 7
2011 - South Florida Storm 21, Broward County Cowboys 19
2010 - South Florida Broncos 34, Brevard Warriors 27
2009 - Brevard Warriors 45, Central Florida Thoroughbreds 10
2008 - Knights of Miami 27, Central Florida Thoroughbreds 17
2007 - Central Florida Thoroughbreds 30, Miami Knights 28
2006 - Ocala Thoroughbreds 24, Knights of Miami21 (OT)
2005 - Orange County Falcons 29, Ocala Thoroughbreds 12
2004 - Knights of Miami 39, Florida Kings 36
2003 - Knights of Miami 32, Tampa Bay Bulldogs 19
1998-2002 League was not in operation
1997 - Knights of Miami (declared champions; no championship game)
1996 - Gainesville Growlers (no championship game information available)

Sources
Florida Division of Corporations
Semi-Pro HQ
American Football News Today
Minor League Football News
Treasure Coast Sports Commission
National Football Events

External links

1995 establishments in Florida
Semi-professional American football
Organizations based in Miami
American football in Florida
American football leagues in the United States
Sports leagues established in 1995